Murielle Magellan (born 1967) is a French writer and theater director.

She was born Murielle Dbjay in Limoges and grew up in Montauban. She took the name Murielle Magellan when she moved to Paris at the age of 17. Magellan studied at the Studio des Variétés and the school of the Théâtre national de Chaillot there. She lived in Montreuil for ten years and has lived in Rosny-sous-Bois since 2001.

She was coauthor for the television mini-series  which won a Globe de Cristal Award in 2006. She was also coauthor for the television film , based on the novel by Émile Zola.

Selected works 
 La saveur subtile des dinosaures, play (1995)
 Pierre et Papillon, play, received the Prix de l’association Beaumarchais in 2002
 Le Lendemain Gabrielle, novel (2007)
 Traits d'union, play
 (Sous les jupes des filles, film script
 Si j’étais un homme, film script
 Les Petits Meurtres d'Agatha Christie, television series
 Un refrain sur les murs, novel (2011)
 N’oublie pas les oiseaux, novel (2014)
 Les indociles, novel (2016)
 Changer le sens des rivières, novel

References

External links 
 

1967 births
Living people
French women novelists
French women screenwriters
French dramatists and playwrights